The meridian 103° east of Greenwich is a line of longitude that extends from the North Pole across the Arctic Ocean, Asia, the Indian Ocean, the Southern Ocean, and Antarctica to the South Pole.

The 103rd meridian east forms a great circle with the 77th meridian west.

From Pole to Pole
Starting at the North Pole and heading south to the South Pole, the 103rd meridian east passes through:

{| class="wikitable plainrowheaders"
! scope="col" width="130" | Co-ordinates
! scope="col" | Country, territory or sea
! scope="col" | Notes
|-
| style="background:#b0e0e6;" | 
! scope="row" style="background:#b0e0e6;" | Arctic Ocean
| style="background:#b0e0e6;" |
|-
| style="background:#b0e0e6;" | 
! scope="row" style="background:#b0e0e6;" | Laptev Sea
| style="background:#b0e0e6;" |
|-
| 
! scope="row" | 
| Krasnoyarsk Krai — Bolshevik Island, Severnaya Zemlya
|-
| style="background:#b0e0e6;" | 
! scope="row" style="background:#b0e0e6;" | Kara Sea
| style="background:#b0e0e6;" |
|-valign="top"
| 
! scope="row" | 
| Krasnoyarsk Krai Irkutsk Oblast — from  Republic of Buryatia — from 
|-
| 
! scope="row" | 
|
|-valign="top"
| 
! scope="row" | 
| Inner Mongolia Gansu — from  Qinghai — for about 7 km from  Gansu — from  Sichuan — from  Yunnan — from  Sichuan — from  Yunnan — from 
|-
| 
! scope="row" | 
|
|-
| 
! scope="row" | 
|
|-
| 
! scope="row" | 
|
|-
| 
! scope="row" | 
| Mainland and island of Koh Kong
|-
| style="background:#b0e0e6;" | 
! scope="row" style="background:#b0e0e6;" | Gulf of Thailand
| style="background:#b0e0e6;" |
|-
| style="background:#b0e0e6;" | 
! scope="row" style="background:#b0e0e6;" | South China Sea
| style="background:#b0e0e6;" |
|-
| 
! scope="row" | 
| Redang Island
|-
| style="background:#b0e0e6;" | 
! scope="row" style="background:#b0e0e6;" | Gulf of Thailand
| style="background:#b0e0e6;" |
|-
| 
! scope="row" | 
| Passing just east of Batu Pahat, Johor at 1°51'N
|-
| style="background:#b0e0e6;" | 
! scope="row" style="background:#b0e0e6;" | Strait of Malacca
| style="background:#b0e0e6;" |
|-
| 
! scope="row" | 
| Islands of Rangsang, Tebing Tinggi and Sumatra
|-
| style="background:#b0e0e6;" | 
! scope="row" style="background:#b0e0e6;" | Indian Ocean
| style="background:#b0e0e6;" |
|-
| style="background:#b0e0e6;" | 
! scope="row" style="background:#b0e0e6;" | Southern Ocean
| style="background:#b0e0e6;" |
|-
| 
! scope="row" | Antarctica
| Australian Antarctic Territory, claimed by 
|-
|}

External links
103rd Meridian East - Russian/English Magazine published in Singapore

e103 meridian east